Vanessa Crokaert (born 3 December 1979), better known by the stage name Vanessa Van Cartier, is a Belgian-Dutch drag queen based in Rotterdam, The Netherlands. She is best known for winning the second season of Drag Race Holland. She became the franchise's third trans woman to win. Previously, she was named Miss Continental 2019 and reigned until 2021.

Vanessa Van Cartier is the "drag mother" of season 1 winner Envy Peru. In 2021, Entertainment Weekly Joey Nolfi described her as "a trans trailblazer who broke barriers" for her representation at Miss Continental.

Filmography

Television

Discography

As featured artist

Awards and nominations

References

Living people
Drag Race Holland winners
People from Rotterdam
People from Zele
Transgender women
Transgender drag performers
1979 births